Erotic Ghost Story is a "Category III" rated Hong Kong erotic film. Directed by Lam Ngai Kai and starring Amy Yip, So Man, Hitomi Kudo and Manfred Wong, and was released in 1990. The film became a box office success in Hong Kong, and Erotic Ghost Story II was made and released in 1991. It incorporates themes from Pu Songling's Strange Tales from a Chinese Studio and its story is largely influenced by The Witches of Eastwick.

Synopsis
Erotic Ghost Story revolves around three fox spirits (played by Yip, Man and Kudô) who have attained human form. Upon helping a hapless scholar, the trio begin to have lustful thoughts about him. This soon leads to many erotic romps and the eventual discovery that he is a dangerous demon.

Cast and roles
 Amy Yip - Hua-Hua
 Ha Chia Ling - The scholar	
 Man So - Pai So-So
 Hitomi Kudo - Fei Fei
 Ha Chi Chun - Mrs. Wang, the neighbor
 Lam Chung - Hsuan Kuei
 Sin Lap-Man - Wu Ming
 Manfred Wong - Mr. Wang, the neighbor

References

External links
 
 
 
 HK cinemagic entry
 lovehkfilm entry
 Erotic Ghost Story - Review Film and DVD by Xavier Desbarats (http://www.devildead.com) 

1990 films
1990 horror films
1990s sex comedy films
1990s erotic films
1990 fantasy films
1990 LGBT-related films
1990s Cantonese-language films
Hong Kong ghost films
Hong Kong sex comedy films
Films based on Strange Stories from a Chinese Studio
Demons in film
Erotic fantasy films
LGBT-related horror films
1990s Hong Kong films